Nels Ackerson is an American lawyer and head of the law firm that bears his name, based in Washington, D.C. He has represented clients in 46 states and 16 countries on issues involving property rights, constitutional rights, agriculture, eminent domain, commercial and financial disputes, public policy, and international disputes. His law practice has included individual cases, class actions, mediation, appellate advocacy in state and federal courts, regulatory disputes, testimony before congressional committees and state legislatures, and international arbitration.  
Ackerson has received Martindale-Hubbell's highest rating – AV Premier – for legal ability and ethics. He has been identified by his peers as a Super Lawyer and is listed in the American Registry, the Worldwide Registry, and Who's Who in the World. He is a member of the bar of the United States Supreme Court, numerous federal courts, the District of Columbia and his home state of Indiana. He is a member of the American Bar Association, the American Association for Justice, the International Society of Barristers, and other bar associations. 
His public positions have included Chief Counsel of the U.S. Senate Subcommittee on the Constitution, nominee for the U.S. Congress, and representing the United States on trade and advisory missions to the Middle East, Africa and Eastern Europe. He organized and managed the first American law office in Egypt, and was a founder and president of the American Chamber of Commerce in Egypt.

Purdue University has recognized Ackerson as a distinguished alumnus and an "Old Master," and has awarded Ackerson its honorary degree of Doctor of Agriculture, citing his "legal accomplishments that will have lasting impact on landowner rights."

Background 
Farm: The grandson of Swedish immigrants and the son of a farmer and a teacher, Ackerson grew up on his family's small dairy farm in Westfield, Indiana, where he attended Westfield public schools, was active in 4-H and other youth organizations, and was class president and valedictorian. In 2009 Ackerson was recognized as a member of the first class to be inducted into the Westfield Washington High School Hall of Fame.

Purdue University: Ackerson earned a B.S. degree with distinction in Agricultural Economics at Purdue University, where he served as student body president, and received the G. A. Ross Award as the most outstanding male graduate. Ackerson joined FarmHouse Fraternity and later served on its International Board of Directors. During his freshman year at Purdue, Ackerson served as Indiana State President of the Future Farmers of America (FFA).

Interim Period:  During his sophomore year at Purdue Ackerson was elected National FFA President, a full-time position that required him to take a one-year leave from his formal education.  As National FFA President, Ackerson presided over the desegregation of the FFA and the New Farmers of America (NFA), a parallel youth organization for African Americans in states that had previously practiced racial segregation. He spoke at conventions and high school commencements, and he met with educators, agricultural leaders, leaders of industry and elected officials across the nation and in the White House.

Harvard Law School: Ackerson was awarded the Juris Doctor degree with distinction by the Harvard Law School where he was an editor of the Harvard Law Review. As a Harvard Law Review editor, he co-authored a student article on the role of community development corporations in economic development, which remains one of the Harvard Law Review's most comprehensive student-authored legal articles.

Harvard University, John F. Kennedy School of Government: Ackerson also received the degree of Master in Public Policy from Harvard University, as a member of the first class of students in Harvard's joint degree program through the John F. Kennedy School of Government and Harvard Law School. One of Ackerson's Kennedy School thesis papers remains listed as a teaching tool. The Kennedy School on several occasions has asked Ackerson to join its delegation to the World Economic Forum in Davos, Switzerland.

Family: Ackerson lives in Potomac, Maryland. He and his wife, Sharon Carroll Ackerson, have four children and six grandchildren. Ackerson is a member and officer in of the Potomac Presbyterian Church.

Career 

1971 – 1976: Indiana Law Practice: After graduating from Harvard Law School in 1971, Ackerson joined the Indianapolis law firm Barnes, Hickam, Pantzer & Boyd (now Barnes & Thornburg), where he tried cases before judges and juries in state and federal courts. Ackerson was active in many civic and public policy issues in Indiana, which he recalls as wonderful time of growth in an excellent law firm under the guidance of highly skilled and generous colleagues in an enjoyable community. (Following his experience on the staff of the United States Senate, Ackerson returned to practice law in Indiana).

1976 – 1979: United States Senate Staff: 
In 1976 Ackerson accepted a staff position in the U.S. Senate to serve under the leadership of Indiana Senator Birch Bayh, a member of the Senate Committee on the Judiciary and Chairman of the Subcommittee on the Constitution. Ackerson held the positions of Chief Counsel and Executive Director of the Senate Subcommittee on the Constitution.

Equal Rights Amendment: As Chief Counsel, Ackerson was a leading Senate staff member to assist with Senate consideration and passage of the Equal Rights Amendment. The Equal Rights Amendment (or ERA) would have ensured equal rights of women under all provisions of the Constitution. The resolution passed both Houses and was signed by President Carter, but it failed to receive the required positive vote by legislatures in three-fourths of the States. President Carter recognized Ackerson's work in the Senate in support of the Equal Rights Amendment by presenting Ackerson with one of the pens that he used to sign the Resolution that had been passed by both Houses.

Direct Popular Election of the President: Ackerson was the lead staff member in the U. S. Senate to assist with consideration and passage of the proposed Direct Election Amendment to the U.S. Constitution. The Direct Election Amendment would have abolished the Electoral College and provided for direct popular election of the President. This amendment received a majority vote in the Senate and the House of Representatives, but the resolution fell short of the votes necessary to overcome a Senate filibuster. That was the only time in U.S. history that a resolution for the direct election of the President received a majority vote in both Houses of Congress.

Bio Fuel Incentives: In addition to his responsibilities involving the U.S. Constitution, Ackerson also served as Senator Birch Bayh's advisor on agricultural policy. In that role, Ackerson proposed the first legislation passed by Congress and enacted into law to provide incentives for the production of alternatives to petroleum-based fuels. The law was co-authored on a bipartisan basis by Democratic Senator Bayh and Republican Senator Bob Dole and is credited with much of the early success in the development and use of alternative, environmentally sound and economically beneficial fuels from biological sources.

University & Small Business Patent Protection (Bayh–Dole Act): Ackerson also proposed legislation to permit universities, colleges and small businesses to obtain patents on inventions that had resulted in part from research funded by federal grants. Such patents had previously been held by the federal government, which made commercialization difficult if not impossible and dampened university research efforts. Co-authored by Senator Birch Bayh and Senator Bob Dole, the law is known as the Bayh–Dole Act. It has been credited with enabling public access and benefit from inventions; stimulating increased university research and practical commercial applications, generating an estimated revenues in the hundreds of millions or even billions of dollars for higher education, and creating tens of thousands of jobs.

1979 – 1982: Return to Private Law Practice: 
Ackerson returned to Indiana and became a partner in the Noblesville law firm of Campbell Kyle Proffitt – a highly regarded law firm in Hamilton County where Ackerson spent his youth on the Ackerson family's farm.  Ackerson continued his law practice as a trial attorney in state and federal courts, and was the Democratic nominee for Congress in Indiana's Fifth Congressional District where he was defeated by the long-time and widely respected Republican Congressman, Bud Hillis.

1982 – 1985: First American Law Firm in Egypt:

In a dramatic change of his career, Ackerson's law practice turned to international legal issues in 1982, as he accepted a partnership in one of the nation's best-known law firms, Sidley & Austin (Now Sidley Austin).  Ackerson had worked with Sidley & Austin's partners in successful class action litigation, but the firm recruited him for a bigger role – to open the first American law firm office in Egypt. Ackerson opened the office with a distinguished Egyptian lawyer and former diplomat, Gamal Naguib, and the firm was named Sidley & Austin & Naguib.

Sidley & Austin & Naguib: Ackerson and Naguib staffed the new Egyptian office with distinguished lawyers who had served as judges in Egypt's highest courts, prominent retired diplomats, professors from Cairo University Law School, well educated young Egyptian lawyers and lawyers from England, Sweden and the United States.  was managing partner of the office which took on national and international significance, representing American, European Egyptian, Middle Eastern and Asian clients, along with prominent investors, contractors international organizations. Ackerson's practice included international arbitration in Europe and the Middle East, international investment and trade advice and disputes and diplomatic assignments. Egyptians lawyers in the office practiced in those international areas and also in Egyptian courts and regulatory matters.

Egyptian-American Responsibilities: Ackerson became well known in Egyptian legal, business and governmental circles.  He was a founder of the American Chamber of Commerce in Egypt and held the offices of Vice President for Legal Affairs, and then President. AmCham Egypt, as it was called, became actively involved in the progress of the private sector in Egypt. The organization held monthly meetings that attracted prominent speakers, including members of the Cabinets of both Egypt and the United States, as well as prominent business leaders and innovators from the U.S., Egypt and elsewhere. Ackerson also served on the board of the Bilateral Fulbright Commission.

1985 – 1991: Sidley & Austin in the U.S. 
	In 1985 Ackerson returned to the United States and continued his practice as a Sidley & Austin partner. He continued his international practice and also returned to litigation of substantial cases  in federal and state courts across the country. Among his successful cases were the largest patent infringement cases at the time in terms of potential damages; highly controverted international trade disputes, litigation arising from a corporate acquisition between two Fortune 500 companies, federal regulatory litigation and appeals, litigation to save the 37 banks in the Farm Credit System during the Farm Credit financial crisis of the 1980s, continuing into the early 1990s, and human rights litigation.

1991 – Present: The Ackerson Group—Ackerson Kauffman Fex:
In 1991 Ackerson left the big firm practice to form the law firm that continues to bear his name.   The name has changed to include his valued colleagues and is now Ackerson Kauffman Fex. Despite its size as a small firm, Ackerson Kauffman Fex has taken on some of the nation's and the world's giants – including governments and governmental bodies and some of the nation's largest companies.

Ackerson Kauffman Fex has been most widely recognized for its successful litigation on behalf of property owners whose land has been taken or used in violation of the law or those who have been threatened with unlawful or unjustified assertions of the power of eminent domain. 
Ackerson and his firm have been involved in landmark cases in Federal Courts of Appeal and the U.S. Supreme Court and have successfully litigated class actions on behalf of landowners in 46 six of the 50 states. Newspapers and magazines, including the Wall Street Journal and the New York Times and others across the nation have reported on the Firm's cases, and both the National Law Journal and American Lawyer have featured the firm's cases on their cover pages. [2]

International development:
Among Ackerson's professional interests are constitutional issues, civil rights, and human rights, examples of which appear above. He also has a long interest in international development and cooperation, and some of his experiences in those areas are the following:
U.S. Trade and Development Missions: Ackerson has participated in United States sponsored and U.S. based international trade and development missions. He was a member of a U. S. Department of Agriculture Trade and Development Mission to several countries in the Middle East, including Egypt and Yemen, and proposed new investment laws that were adopted by subsequently adopted. 
		U.S. Market Economy Advisory Mission: He also was a member of a U.S. Advisory Delegation that had been invited to the former Soviet Union by Secretary General Mikhail Gorbachev to advise Russian and Soviet lawyers on the application of market principles to advance Gobachev's plan for transition to a market economy. Ackerson and others in the U.S. Government supported delegation spoke to hundreds of  lawyers from across the Soviet Union.

		Student Exchange Programs: Ackerson's interest and involvement in international development have also included initiating the process to establish student exchange program for U.S. students in rural areas or with agricultural interests to share experiences in each other's countries, communities, and agricultural pursuits. The first such program was established with the government of Mexico, and was followed by other student exchange programs in Europe and Asia.

		Middle East Law, Policy, and Development:  During Ackerson's three years as managing partner of the first office established by an American law firm in Egypt – and continuing after his return to the U.S. – he  advised clients and participated in international investment and economic development issues in Egypt and elsewhere. While in Egypt Ackerson was one of the founders of the American Chamber of Commerce in Egypt and became its president. Ackerson also was a member of the board of the Bilateral Fulbright Commission in Egypt. Yemen's improved investment law was based on Ackerson's advice. Separately, Ackerson was leader of the U.S. sponsored advisory delegation to  Kazakhstan that followed the meetings in Russia on transition to market economy.

Selected publications 

  Community Development Corporations: A New Approach to the Poverty Problem (co-authored with Lawrence Sharf), Harvard Law Review (Vol. 82, pp 644–667, 1969)
  Report on the Desirability of Increasing the Massachusetts Cigarette Tax
  Harvard University, John F. Kennedy School of Government, Teaching and Research Materials (1971)
  Journal of a Hoosier Lawyer in Cairo, Series of Articles, Indiana State Bar Association Magazine  (1983)
  Doing Business in Egypt (1983-1984) - Series of Articles, Middle East Executive Reports (co-authored with Mohammed Hassouna)
  Speeches/Articles on Farm Credit System
  The Right Way to Cure Right-of-Way Wrongs, Telecom Real Estate Advisor, (Sept-Oct. 2001)       
  Right-of-Way Rights, Wrongs and Remedies: Status, Emerging Issues and Opportunities
  Drake Journal of Agricultural Law (Vol. 8, 2003) - Agricultural Biotechnology: New Risks – New Remedies (2003)
  Presented to American Agricultural Lawyers Association Annual Conference - Right-of-Way Rights, Wrongs and Remedies (2005)
  Presented to the Annual Conference of the American Agricultural Lawyers Association - Corridor Valuation: Law & Practice in a New Environment  (2006)
  Presented to the Appraisal Institute, Washington, DC

Selected congressional testimony 

 Hearing: Litigation and Its Effect on the Rails-to-Trails Program (107th Congress, June 20, 2004) - Committee on the Judiciary, U.S. House of Representatives (Judiciary Subcommittee on Commercial & Admin Law)
 Hearing: National Trails System Act (106th Congress, May 9, 2000, Committee on Natural Resources Subcommittee on National Parks and Public Lands)

External links
Official Campaign Website
Issues
Ackerson Kauffmen Fex
Hoosier Political Report
Purdue University news
www.law.com

1944 births
Living people
Farmers from Indiana
American Presbyterians
Indiana lawyers
Harvard Law School alumni
Harvard Kennedy School alumni
People from Boone County, Indiana
Purdue University College of Agriculture alumni
Indiana Democrats
People from Westfield, Indiana
People associated with Sidley Austin